XHRPR-FM is a radio station on 88.3 FM in Tuxtla Gutiérrez, Chiapas. The station is owned by Grupo Radiorama and carries the El Heraldo Radio news/talk network.

History
XHRPR began as XERPR-AM 1070, with a concession awarded in February 1993. It migrated to FM in 2010 and was the first Mexican station assigned to 88.3 MHz.

On May 31, 2019, XHRPR flipped from "Oye", with a pop format sharing the brand of NRM-owned XEOYE-FM in Mexico City, to adult contemporary as "Oreja FM". It then changed again on August 11, 2019, to Fiesta Mexicana and a grupera format.

This station and co-owned XHEOE-FM in Tapachula began broadcasting El Heraldo Radio on September 21, 2020.

References

Radio stations in Chiapas
Radio stations established in 1993